Diogo José Rosário Gomes Figueiras (born 1 July 1991) is a Portuguese professional footballer who plays as a right-back.

Club career

Early years
Born in Castanheira do Ribatejo e Cachoeiras, Vila Franca de Xira, Figueiras spent six years in S.L. Benfica's youth system after starting off at local U.D. Vilafranquense. He made his senior debut in the 2010–11 season, on loan at C.D. Pinhalnovense in the third division, which he helped reach the quarter-finals of the Taça de Portugal.

Paços de Ferreira
Figueiras joined F.C. Paços de Ferreira in the Primeira Liga in the summer of 2011, signing a three-year contract. He played his first game in the competition on 28 August, a 0–0 away draw against C.D. Feirense in which he was sent off. In the following transfer window, he was loaned to Moreirense F.C. of the Segunda Liga.

Figueiras returned to Paços for the 2012–13 campaign, contributing 19 games in 1,665 minutes of action as the club finished a best-ever third and qualified to the UEFA Champions League for the first time in its history.

Sevilla
On 18 July 2013, Figueiras moved abroad, penning a four-year deal with Sevilla FC in Spain. He made his La Liga debut on 28 September, playing the full 90 minutes in a 1–1 draw at Real Sociedad. In late December, he was handed a four-game ban after calling the referee a "son of a bitch" during a 0–2 home loss against Racing de Santander for the Copa del Rey (2–1 aggregate defeat).

Figueiras scored his first goal as a senior on 16 March 2014, starting and netting his team's last in a 4–1 home win over Real Valladolid. On 27 April, he was sent off in a 3–1 away loss against Athletic Bilbao. He played 12 matches of their victorious campaign in the UEFA Europa League, coming on late in extra time of the final, a penalty shootout victory over S.L. Benfica in Turin; the Andalusians went on to retain their continental crown, but he did not enter the field in the decisive game against FC Dnipro Dnipropetrovsk.

On 9 July 2015, Figueiras was loaned to Genoa C.F.C. of Serie A, with the option to buy. He totalled ten appearances for the team, scoring to open a 1–2 home defeat to Carpi F.C. 1909 on 29 November. His loan was cut short the following 30 January, with Sevilla manager Unai Emery needing cover for the injured Marco Andreolli.

Olympiacos
On 25 May 2016, Figueiras signed a three-year contract with Olympiacos F.C. for a fee of €1.5 million. He joined compatriot Marco Silva (manager) at the Greek champions.

Figueiras scored once from 24 appearances in his first season (all starts), helping the club win the Super League for the seventh time in a row.

Braga
Figueiras returned to Portugal on 30 January 2018, joining S.C. Braga on a three-and-a-half-year deal worth €1.2 million. Deemed surplus to requirements by manager Abel Ferreira shortly after his arrival, he was later demoted to the reserve team.

On 30 August 2019, Figueiras was loaned to fellow top-flight side Rio Ave F.C. for the season. He played just over half of the games for the Vilacondenses who finished a joint-best fifth with a record points tally, and was sent off on 17 June at the end of a 2–1 home loss to Benfica for alleging that the referee had been bribed; he was given a two-match ban for this statement.

Famalicão
Figueiras signed a one-and-a-half-year contract with F.C. Famalicão on 21 January 2021, after severing his ties with Braga.

International career
On 8 February 2011, Figueiras earned his only cap for the Portugal under-20s, as a late substitute in a 1–1 draw with Norway in Rio Maior in preparation for the summer's FIFA World Cup.

Personal life
Figueiras' father, Rosário (born 1965), played as a left winger. He made 83 top-flight appearances and scored 16 goals for S.C.U. Torreense, Vitória de Setúbal, Boavista F.C. and F.C. Felgueiras in the 1990s.

Career statistics

Honours
Sevilla
UEFA Europa League: 2013–14, 2014–15, 2015–16
UEFA Super Cup runner-up: 2014

Olympiacos
Super League Greece: 2016–17

References

External links

1991 births
Living people
People from Vila Franca de Xira
Sportspeople from Lisbon District
Portuguese footballers
Association football defenders
Primeira Liga players
Liga Portugal 2 players
Segunda Divisão players
U.D. Vilafranquense players
C.D. Pinhalnovense players
F.C. Paços de Ferreira players
Moreirense F.C. players
S.C. Braga players
Rio Ave F.C. players
F.C. Famalicão players
La Liga players
Sevilla FC players
Serie A players
Genoa C.F.C. players
Super League Greece players
Olympiacos F.C. players
UEFA Europa League winning players
Portugal youth international footballers
Portuguese expatriate footballers
Expatriate footballers in Spain
Expatriate footballers in Italy
Expatriate footballers in Greece
Portuguese expatriate sportspeople in Spain
Portuguese expatriate sportspeople in Italy
Portuguese expatriate sportspeople in Greece